Oliver Roy Bennett (born 7 November 1992) is a rallycross driver from Bristol, United Kingdom. He is the co-founder of the Xite Energy drink company, and competes in the FIA World Rallycross Championship and Extreme E for the Xite Energy Racing team.

Early career
Bennett started his racing career competing in motocross from the age of 8, through to 18 when he competed in the European MX championship.

An accident left him unable to continue competition on two wheels so he made the move to four wheels competing in Rallycross.

Rallycross
In 2016 he made his debut in British Rallycross Championship racing an ex-OSME Ford Fiesta.

In 2017 he finished on the podium 7 out of 9 races and despite scoring the most points that season, he narrowly miss out on the overall title due to dropped point scores; he also got his first taste of World Rallycross action at Lydden Hill in a one-off race.

Towards the end of the 2017 season, Bennett's team XITE Racing built a rallycross spec BMW MINI Cooper Supercar to compete in the FIA World Rallycross Championship, debuting it in the first round of the British Rallycross season at Silverstone.

His 2018 World RX season started at the first round in Barcelona where he finished with a 15th position in a tough line up and wet conditions.

The team continued their development of the car throughout the year, before Bennett made his Americas Rallycross debut, narrowly missing on semi-finals in his three appearances.

Following the end of the 2018 World RX season, Bennett made his Gymkhana GRiD debut in Cape Town, South Africa.

In 2019 Bennett will be entering the FIA World Rallycross Championship once again, backed by XITE Energy and automotive social media site Drive Tribe.

Dirt Rally 2.0
Bennett's Ford Fiesta rallycross car along with the XITE Racing Mini SX1 is available as a playable car in the Dirt Rally 2.0 game from Codemasters.

Racing record

Complete FIA World Rallycross Championship results

Supercar/RX1

a Loss of 10 championship points – stewards' decision

b Loss of 10 championship points – stewards' decision

Complete Extreme E results
(key)

* Season still in progress.

References

World Rallycross Championship drivers
Sportspeople from Bristol
Living people
1992 births
Extreme E drivers